The 2005–06 Latvian Hockey League season was the 15th season of the Latvian Hockey League, the top level of ice hockey in Latvia. Seven teams participated in the league, and HK Riga 2000 won the championship.

Regular season

Playoffs

Quarterfinals 
  HK Riga 2000 -  SC Energija 2:0
  DHK Latgale -  SK Riga 20 2:0
  HK Liepājas Metalurgs -  HK Vilki Riga 2:0

Semifinals 
  HK Riga 2000 -  DHK Latgale 3:0
  ASK/Ogre -  HK Liepājas Metalurgs 0:3

3rd place 
  ASK/Ogre -  DHK Latgale 0:2

Final
  HK Riga 2000 -  HK Liepājas Metalurgs 4:1

External links
 Season on hockeyarchives.info

Latvian Hockey League
Latvian Hockey League seasons
Latvian